The Revolutionary Communist Party was a British Trotskyist group, formed in 1944 and active until 1949, which published the newspaper Socialist Appeal and a theoretical journal, Workers International News. The party was the ancestor of the three main currents of British Trotskyism: Gerry Healy's Workers Revolutionary Party, Ted Grant's Militant tendency and Tony Cliff's Socialist Workers Party.

Collapse of the RSL and founding of the RCP

The party was founded as the official section of the Fourth International in Britain after the Revolutionary Socialist League collapsed. Moreover, the RSL had not adopted the positions of the Fourth International with regard to the Second World War and was polemicising against the Workers International League (WIL), declaring it to be following politics which it characterised as social patriotic. The positions of the WIL corresponded to those of the Fourth International and the American SWP and as a result the latter decided that the WIL should become the International's British section.

In order to draw the WIL into the International, the Americans exerted pressure on the three factions of the RSL to re-unite, after which the re-formed RSL could fuse with the larger WIL. The fused group, which adopted the politics of the majority WIL group, became the Revolutionary Communist Party. The leadership bodies of the new party incorporated leaders of the RSL such as Denzil Dean Harber and John Lawrence, with the exception of the old RSL Left Fraction who soon left.

Recruiting methods
The new party maintained an entrist faction in the Labour Party. This faction was led by Charlie van Gelderen and maintained publication of The Militant as its organ.

The main area on which the party concentrated however was the industrial front. This led to recruitment from the Communist Party but more recruits came from direct intervention in the industrial struggles of the war years such as that of the Kent miners and the Tyneside engineering apprentices. This latter dispute led to the RCP receiving the attention of the police as their headquarters in London were raided and a number of leading members were jailed. In furtherance of this industrial work a Militant Workers Federation was organised by the RCP in conjunction with the Industrial Committee of the Independent Labour Party and some anarchists.

During the war the RCP opposed the electoral truce which guaranteed that where parliamentary seats fell vacant they would automatically be filled by another member of the incumbent party. When an opportunity for the RCP to stand occurred, the party stood their leader, Jock Haston, in the Neath by-election of 1945.

The Left Fraction of the former RSL remained organised within the RCP but were expelled in 1945 and pursued entrist work in the Labour Party work around the Voice of Labour newspaper. It broke up in 1950, when most of its members joined the Socialist Fellowship group which was associated with the paper Socialist Outlook. Other former Left Fraction members revived the group in the early 1960s.

End
In 1947, the party split over the question of entrism into the Labour Party. Jock Haston and Ted Grant opposed it; Gerry Healy and John Lawrence formed a faction in favour of it. With the agreement of both groups, the International Secretariat divided the British section and the minority pursued the entry tactic and published the newspaper Socialist Outlook from 1948.

The remaining RCP found existence outside the Labour Party increasingly difficult with the end of wartime militancy. The RCP's membership and influence started to decline. The new regimes in Eastern Europe caused further debate within the RCP, as they did within the International as a whole. The leadership of the RCP around Haston was more cautious with regard to declaring these new regimes to be degenerated workers states than the International's leadership around Ernest Mandel and Michel Pablo.

A debate developed as to whether the RCP should enter the Labour Party. The majority supported entry. A faction was declared by some supporters of the leadership, which firmly opposed entry. This grouping of RCPers called itself the Open Party Faction and was increasingly disillusioned with the leadership around Jock Haston and Ted Grant whom they thought to be caving in to Healy's entry group, ultimately leading to a decision to dissolve the RCP in 1950 and join the Labour Party.

The International then ordered that the members of the RCP join Healy's entry group, known as The Club, but that despite being in a majority they were not able to exercise democratic control of the fused group. Jock Haston immediately dropped out of politics as did much of the remaining leadership. Ted Grant made a decision to join the fused group but was purged by Healy who strongly discouraged dissent.

Some of Tony Cliff's supporters in Birmingham were expelled – Cliff himself could not be expelled being resident in Dublin and therefore beyond Healy's reach – and then when Grant attempted to defend the rights of Cliff's supporters he too was expelled. Cliff would regroup his supporters around the magazine Socialist Review and Grant similarly formed a group called the International Socialist Group. Most former members of the RCP had left the Trotskyist movement by the end of 1951.

Members
 Jim Allen
 Sam Bornstein
 Maurice Brinton
 Tony Cliff
 Jimmy Deane
 Charlie van Gelderen
 Mildred Gordon
 Ted Grant
 Duncan Hallas
 Betty Hamilton
 Denzil Dean Harber
 Jock Haston
 Gerry Healy
 Jeanne Hoban
 Bill Hunter
 John Lawrence
 Anil Moonesinghe
 Stan Newens
 T. Dan Smith

References

Further reading
Upham, Martin, 'The History of British Trotskyism to 1949' (PhD thesis), on the Marxists.org mirror of the Revolutionary History website.

External links
Archive of the Socialist Appeal, paper of the RCP from Bill Hunter's website
Crawford, Ted, "HO45/25486: a report on the RCP and the Trotskyist movement", Revolutionary History, May 2003. 'HO 45/25486 seems to be the main source of Special Branch records of RCP and Club activities (up to c. 1954). It is about 1000 pages or so, divided into 24 internal folders.'